António de Sousa Braga  (15 March 1941 – 22 August 2022) was a Portuguese Roman Catholic prelate.

De Sousa was born in Portugal and was ordained to the priesthood in 1970. He served as bishop of the Roman Catholic Diocese of Angra, Portugal from 1996 until his retirement in 2016.

References

External links 
 

1941 births
2022 deaths
20th-century Roman Catholic bishops in Portugal
Bishops appointed by Pope John Paul II
21st-century Roman Catholic bishops in Portugal
People from Santa Maria Island